This is the famous fort of odisha

Barabati Fort is a 987 CE fort built by Marakata Keshari of Somavamshi (Keshari) dynasty in Cuttack, Odisha. The ruins of the fort remain with its moat, gate, and the earthen mound of the nine-storied palace, which evokes the memories of past days. Today it sits next to the modern Barabati Stadium, the venue of various sport events and cultural programs. There is also a temple dedicated to Katak Chandi, the presiding deity of the city, not far away from the fort. Now there are plans to develop the old Gadakhai into a world class tourist destination with boating facilities and a world class park. The renovation work of the Gadakhai is going on in full swing.

Location

History
The Barabati was built in 987 CE by the Somavamshi dynasty lineage ruler Maharaja Markata Keshari while building a stone embankment to protect Cuttack which was known as Kataka at that time.

Scholars give different opinions regarding the date of construction of Barabati fort. Madalapanji, the Jagannatha temple chronicle narrates an interesting story which is as follows.

King Anangabhima Deva III of the Eastern Ganga dynasty lived in his capital, Chaudwar (1211-1238 A.D.) One day the king crossed the Mahanadi and came towards the southern side. Here he noticed in the Barabati village belonging to the Ko-danda sub-division that near the god Visweswar, a heron had jumped upon a hawk. Seeing this the king was very much surprised and on an auspicious day laid the foundation of construction of the fort and this village was named Barabati Cuttack. And after that he left Choudwar and lived at Cuttack making it his capital.

In 1568 AD, the city passed to the hands of Karranis of Bengal, then to the Mughal Empire in 1576 and then to the Maratha Empire in 1741. Cuttack, with the rest of Odisha, came under British rule in 1803. The Bengal-Nagpur Railways connected Cuttack with Madras (Chennai) and Calcutta (Kolkata) in 1919. It became the capital of the newly formed state of Odisha in 1936 and continued to be so till 1948 when the capital was shifted to Bhubaneswar. The city completed one thousand years of its existence in 1989.

During the rule of the Muslims and the Marathas it continued to be the capital of Odisha. The British army took possession of Barabati fort on October 1803, and it became a prison for confinement of several illustrious rulers of the land. In 1800 the Raja of Kujanga, in 1818 the Raja of Surgaja with his family members were kept under strict confinement to this fort. In addition vandalism to destroy the fort was intensified in the early phase of British rule.

Architecture

The fort is square in plan. It spreads over an area of 102 acres and surrounded on all sides with a stone paved moat of 10 Mtr. width in northern and western sides and 20 Mtr. width in the eastern and southern sides. The entire fort wall except the entrance is missing. Since, 1915, in view of its national importance, the place has been declared as a protected site by Archaeological Survey of India.

At the centre of the fort there was a high mound with a tank in the western side. It spreads over 15/16 acres of area. Now the site is under extensive encroachment. To the east of the mound, there is the Shahi Mosque while in the west of the tank lies the mazar of Hazrat Ali Bukhari. In 1989 excavations were carried out by Archaeological Survey of India to ascertain the cultural horizon of the historic fort and the work is still in progress. Excavation by Archaeological survey of India on December 1st 1989 revealed evidence of a palace, a square structure built up of Khondalite stone. It was built over an area which was carefully prepared by filling up of 5 meter with sand and lime mixture. Trenches dug on the eastern side of the structure revealed 32 pillars built of literate blocks roughly square but varying in size.

In the northeastern corner of the mound remains of a temple have been found. Excavation on the eastern and southern side of the mound revealed the existence of a citadel wall built of laterite blocks.

The ruins of the old Barabati Fort lie on the right bank of the Mahanadi, in the western part of the city. All that remains of the Fort is an arched gateway and the earthen mound of the nine-storeyed palace. To the west of the mound there is a tank. In the north-eastern corner of the mound are remains of what once was a temple. The temple was made of whitish sandstone over foundations of laterite blocks. About four hundred fragments of mouldings and some mutilated pieces of sculptures have been recovered so far. This temple of the Ganga period containing a stone idol of Lord Jagannath is in ruins. A mosque built by Nawab Murshid Quli Khan, governor of Emperor Aurangzeb in 1719 AD still exists.

See also
List of Monuments of National Importance in Odisha

References

 History of Odisha by K.C. Panigrahi

External links
 Barabati Fort, Cuttack
 Barabati Fort

Buildings and structures in Cuttack
Forts in Odisha
Monuments of National Importance in Odisha
Tourist attractions in Cuttack district